Fabrice Martin and Hugo Nys won the title over Henri Kontinen and Adrián Menéndez-Maceiras 3–6, 6–3, [10–8].

Seeds

Draw

Draw

References
 Main Draw

Internationaux de Tennis de Vendee - Doubles
2013 Doubles